Riri Fitri Sari (born 7 July 1970) is a professor of Computer Engineering at the Department of Electrical Engineering, Faculty of Engineering, University of Indonesia (UI). She was the CIO / Head of Information System Development and Services of the University of Indonesia (2006-2014). She was the eldest child of the couple Drs Mursyd AM MBA and Dra. Azizah Etek MA who was born on 7 July 1970 in Bukit Tinggi, Indonesia.

In 1997, she received her MSc in Software Systems and Parallel Processing of Department of Computer Science, University of Sheffield, UK and subsequently a PhD from Leeds University, UK (2004). She is currently actively teaching and researching in the field of Internet of Things, Computer Network, Protocol Engineering, and the implementation of Information and Communication Technology. From her marriage to Dr. Ir. Adi Kusno Sambowo, she has three daughters, Almira, Naufalia, and Laura Sambowo.

Since 2010, she has been outstanding actively involved with University Ranking and has been the Chairperson of UI GreenMetric Ranking of World University since then.

Riri Fitri Sari was appointed as one of the Deputy President of ICMI (Indonesian Association of Muslim Intellectuals) in January 2022, under the leadership of Prof. Arif Satria. She coordinates ICMI's program in the field of Health, Empowerment of Women, Children, Youth and the Elderly.

On 10 November 2022, Riri Fitri Sari received the 2022 Habibie Prize from Indonesian National Research Agency (BRIN) and Human Resource Science and Technology Foundation (Yayasan SDM Iptek)  which was granted by the Chair of BRIN - Laksana Trihandoko, Dr. Ilham Habibie, and Prof. Wardiman Djojonegoro at the Habibie Building, BRIN, Jalan Thamrin Jakarta.

In 2022, Riri Fitri Sari delivered many Keynote Speeches at many of UI GreenMetric Events at various universities in Indonesia and overseas such as at Omnes Education (Inseec U) - Paris, COP-27 in Sharm El-Seikh, Sultan Ageng University Tirtayasa (Untirta) Serang, UIN Raden Fatah Palembang, UIN Raden Intan Lampung, Yogyakarta State University, Unsrat Manado, UMN Tangerang, Budi Luhur University Jakarta, and etc. Apart from that, visits to GreenMetric participating universities such as Oxford University, Nottingham Trent University, Warwick University, Al Azhar University in Egypt, 6 October University Cairo, and others in November 2022.

In June 2022 as the chairperson of UI GreenMetric Riri Fitri Sari announced the winner at the launching of the UI GreenCityMetric results. This newly introduced program is the ranking of the most sustainable Cities and Regencies in Indonesia. Meanwhile, the announcement of the UI  GreenMetric world university ranking is usually done in December.

On December 24, 2022, Riri Fitri Sari as the initiator of the Poetry Reading Society of Indonesia (PRSI), held an Online Poetry Reading event with the theme "Borderless Poetry". This event invites ambassadors of the Republic of Indonesia who are on duty in various countries, including Argentina, Czech, India, Kazakhstan, Cuba, Pakistan, and Thailand. This event also invited several former ambassadors and professors, active and retired lecturers, and alumni of the University of Indonesia.  In November 2022, she jointly organised a performance of more than 30 poetry readers, conducted at the Makara Art Center of the University of Indonesia.

Riri Fitri Sari as the chairperson of UI  GreenMetric have jointly collaborated 2 kinds of online courses, i.e., International and Indonesia's universities courses. 
UI GreenMetric International Online course involved collaboration among 7 universities from 7 countries: Brazil, Colombia, Ecuador, Hungary, Indonesia, Tunisia, and The United Arab Emirates. Indonesian Online course involves collaboration of 17 universities to provide a course entitled "Best Practice of Sustainable Development Goals (SDGs) in Indonesia organised from 8 September – 22 December 2022.

Awards 
 2014: KAZNU 80th anniversary Medal of Excellent Service in Education, Kazakhstan.
 2013: Indi Women Technologist, Kartini Award, PT Telkom
 2012: Recipient of the IEEE Region 10 WIE Most Inspiring Engineer Award in Calcutta, India
 2012: Indonesia Inspiring Youth and Women Award from PT Indosat
 2009: The Most Outstanding Lecturer of Indonesia the Ministry of Higher Education (Dikti – Depdiknas)

External links 
  21 Women Achieved Indi Women Awards 2013 in Kompas Female, April 2013
  Biography of Riri Fitri Sari
  Riri Fitri Sari in Dewi Magazine, Juni 2012
  Riri Fitri Sari in Harian Kompas, Mei 24, 2012
  Fitri, Riri Fitri Sari in Gatra, page 104-105, Mei 2, 2012
  Prof Riri Fitri Sari in Jawa Pos, Maret 21, 2012
  Prof Dr. Ir. Riri Fitri Sari in Human Capital Magazine, 070, Januari 2010
  About Riri Fitri Sari
  Publication Riri Fitri Sari
  Susunan Pengurus Pusat ICMI
  Habibie Prize 2022
  UI Greenmetric 2022
  High-Level Segment at COP 27
  Meeting UI Greenmetric
  Green Kampus
  Peringkat 61 Dunia Kampus Hijau Berkelanjutan
  UI Greenmetric 2022
  Kampus Hijau
  Transformasi Kampus
  Siaran Pers UI
  Overall Rankings 2022
  Poetry Reading and Writing Society Of Indonesia
  Praktik Sustainable Development Goals
  UI GreenMetric Online Course
  Riri Fitri Sari, Speech at UANL Mexico Conference on Quality Education, Monterrey, November 13th 2013
 Video (4 min.) of Prof. Dr. Ir.Riri Fitri Sari MM MSc in Profile of the candidate for Rector
 Video (2 min.) of Prof. Dr. Ir.Riri Fitri Sari MM MSc in Comments from Prof. Takako Hashimoto (IEEE WIE, Chiba Univ)
 Video (13 min.) of Riri Fitri Sari in Discussion of Nationalism Lemhanas in TVRI Part 1
 Video (12 min.) of Riri Fitri Sari in Discussion of Nationalism Lemhanas in TVRI Part 2

Living people
1970 births
Indonesian Muslims
Academic staff of the University of Indonesia
Minangkabau people
People from Bukittinggi